Sony Pictures Mobile is an American mobile entertainment licenser and publisher specialising in branded interactive games and personalisation products, which are available for download via mobile devices through Sony Pictures Mobile's distribution relationships with wireless providers and networks worldwide.

Sony Pictures Mobile is a division of Sony Pictures Digital, a Sony Pictures Entertainment company. Sony Pictures Entertainment is part of Sony Entertainment Inc. a Sony company.

Games
List of Sony Pictures mobile games

External links
Sony Pictures Digital

Mobile
Video game companies of the United States
Video game publishers
Entertainment companies based in California
Companies based in Culver City, California